Martin Morin was a French printer of incunables, active in Rouen between about 1490 and 1518. It has been suggested that he was born in or near Orbec around 1450, and died in Rouen around 1522. He learned the trade in the Rhine region where he was sent by the Rouen family Lallemant together with Pierre Maufer, and then became a printer and bookseller in Rouen. His 1492 Breviarium Saresberiense or Breviarium Sarum, a breviary for Salisbury, is said to be "the first recorded liturgical book printed for the English market".

The Incunabula Short Title Catalogue of the British Library lists 34 works. Other works are listed in the Manuel du bibliographe normand: ou, Dictionnaire bibliographique ..., Volume 2 by Édouard Frère.

Publications
1490: Festivalis Liber
About 1490: Breviarium Cenomanense (Le Mans). Ed: Petrus Hennier (new edition about 1500-1503)
About 1492: Breviarium Saresberiense (Salisbury)
1492: Missale Saresberiense (Salisbury) sive Missale secundum Sarum (new edition about 1505)
1492-1493: Horae: ad usum Andegavensem (Angers) [French and Latin]
1493: Missale Turonense (Tours)
About 1494: Horae: ad usum Sarum (Salisbury)
1494: David de Augusta. De exterioris et interioris hominis compositione Lib. II-III ( Profectuum religiosorum)
Guido de Monte Rochen. Manipulus curatorum (also a 1495 edition)
About 1495: Bernardus Claravallensis. De concordantia statuum religiosorum. Add: De dispensatione et praecepto
Bonaventura, S. Diaeta salutis. Add: Devota contemplatio, seu meditatio de nativitate domini
1495: Johannes Chrysostomus. De reparatione lapsi
 Missale Rothomagense (Rouen) (new edition 1499)
About 1496: Robertus Gaguinus. De mundissimo Virginis Mariae conceptu. Comm: Carolus Fernandus
1496: 	Missale Sagiense (Sées)
About 1497: Publius Ovidius Naso. De remedio amoris
1497: Missale Ebroicense (Evreux)
About 1497-1498: Bernardus Claravallensis. De consideratione. Add: Sermo de cute, carne et ossibus animae
Nicolaus Bovillus. Contra obtinentes plura beneficia
Coutumes de Normandie. Add: Usaiges et la forme qu'on a acoustume user en conduite de proces et iudicature de causes en la duchie de normendie
1498: Ebrardus Bethuniensis. Graecismus. Comm: Johannes Vincentius Metulinus
About 1500: Confessionale. Interrogationes et doctrinae
 Franciscus de Assisio. Regula. Testamentum. Ed: Alphonsus de Salamina
 Jean Laillier. De provisione scholasticorum ex Pragmatica Sanctione
 Lucidarius [French] Le lucidaire
 Principia grammatice [French and Latin]
 Heures de Bayeux
About 1500-1510: La vie saint jehan baptiste
About 1503-1506: Examen de conscience
After 1503: Nicolaus Denyse. Gemma praedicantium (also an edition from about 1507)
1504-1505: Alain Chartier. La belle dame sans merci
1505: Missale Abrincensis (Avranches)
1506: Nicolaus Denyse. Opus super Sententias Petri Lombardi quod Resolutio theologorum dicitur
 Missale Ambianense (Amiens)
 Noviomense (Noyon)
1507 or later: Nicolaus de Lyra. Tractatus de differentia nostrae translationis ab hebraica littera in Veteri Testamento
1507: Apologia Frederici Le Vicomte
1510: Aelius Donatus. Ars minor
1518: Heures de Rouen (two editions)

Notes

Further reading
  Édouard Frère, De l'imprimerie et de la librairie à Rouen, dans les XVe et XVIe siècles, et de Martin Morin, célèbre imprimeur rouennais, Rouen, Le Brument, 1843.

Year of birth unknown
Year of death unknown
French printers
Businesspeople from Rouen
15th-century French businesspeople
Printers of incunabula